The Newtownabbey Ratepayers' Association was a minor political party operating in Newtownabbey, Northern Ireland

It contested elections for Newtownabbey Borough Council from 1997 to 2005 and registered as a political party with the Electoral Commission in 2001.

The party had 2 councillors elected in the 1997 local elections, 1 in 2001 and 1 in 2005. In the 2005 elections the party stood candidates in 3 of Newtownabbey's 4 electoral areas and polled 1897 votes, 6.4% of the votes in the borough.

In their statement of accounts for the year to the end of 2005, the party declared that they had a membership of 23.

Their sole remaining elected councillor, Billy Webb, joined the Alliance Party of Northern Ireland in April 2008.

See also
The Community Group (London Borough of Hounslow)

References

External links
Newtownabbey Ratepayers Association

Politics of County Antrim
Defunct political parties in Northern Ireland